Josef Šilhavý (born 17 December 1946) is a Czech athlete. He competed in the men's discus throw at the 1976 Summer Olympics. His wife, Zdeňka Šilhavá, was also a discus thrower for Czechoslovakia.

References

1946 births
Living people
Athletes (track and field) at the 1976 Summer Olympics
Czech male discus throwers
Olympic athletes of Czechoslovakia
Place of birth missing (living people)